Cubolta is a commune in Sîngerei District, Moldova. It is composed of two villages, Cubolta and Mărășești.

Notable people 
 Ion Halippa 
 Pan Halippa 
 Sergiu Grossu

References

Communes of Sîngerei District